The Meaning of Socialism is a book by British philosopher Michael Luntley, published in 1989 by Duckworth and in 1990 by Open Court. The book covers the meaning and philosophy of socialism. The book received reviews from journals including Reason Papers and American Political Science Review, along with being widely cited in its field.

References 

1989 non-fiction books
Books about socialism
Philosophy books
Gerald Duckworth and Company books